Mesapamea remmi is a moth belonging to the family Noctuidae. The species was first described by Ladislaus Rezbanyai-Reser in 1985. For diagnosis See Townsend et al.

It is native to Europe.

References

Noctuidae
Insects described in 1985